The Takhti Stadium of Ahvaz is a multi-purpose stadium in Ahvaz, Iran. It is currently used mostly for football and rugby matches. The stadium is able to hold 15,000 people. It is currently home venue of Esteghlal Ahvaz.

History
The stadium was built in 1978, there have been many disputes as to the name of Takhti Stadium. The argument being that it would have been prevalent to have named the stadium after talented players produced by Ahvaz itself.

The stadium had been the home of both Esteghlal Ahvaz and Foolad in past years. Foolad was relegated in 2007, they were as such not allowed to play all the matches in this stadium. In 2013 Foolad permanently moved to a much bigger Ghadir Stadium. The stadium was renovated in summer 2012 and then, Esteghlal Khuzestan purchased its rights with a contract until 2014.

Location
The stadium is 6 km from the center of city of Ahvaz. Takhti Stadium is 1.5 meters (5 ft) below sea level.

References

Football venues in Iran
Multi-purpose stadiums in Iran
Sport in Ahvaz
Buildings and structures in Khuzestan Province
1984 establishments in Iran
Sports venues completed in 1984
Esteghlal Ahvaz F.C.